Prentiss is a town in Jefferson Davis County, Mississippi. The population was 1,081 at the 2010 census, down from 1,158 at the 2000 census. It is the county seat.

Prentiss is located on the Longleaf Trace, Mississippi's first recreational rail trail.

History
Originally part of Lawrence County, the town was first named "Blountville", after William Blount, an early settler and merchant.

A depot was established in Blountville when the Pearl & Leaf Rivers Railroad (later Illinois Central Railroad) was completed in 1903. That same year the town was officially established and named "Prentiss", after Prentiss Webb Berry, a prominent landowner in the area. When Jefferson Davis County was created in 1906, a special election determined that Prentiss would serve as the county seat.

In 1907, Jonas Edward Johnson and his wife Bertha LaBranche Johnson established the Prentiss Institute. The school at first taught only the elementary grades, and began with 40 students whose tuition was often paid with chickens, eggs and produce. In 1955, Heifer International donated 15 pure-bred cows to the school with the intention that the offspring be donated to needy farm families. It is noteworthy that the school gave some of the animals to poor white families. The school closed in 1989 and was designated an official Mississippi landmark in 2002.

Ralph Fults and Raymond Hamilton, members of the notorious Barrow Gang, robbed the bank in Prentiss in 1935.

In 1958, Rev. H.D. Darby of Prentiss filed a federal lawsuit challenging Mississippi's rigid voting eligibility laws for African Americans; it was the first lawsuit of its kind in Mississippi.

Prentiss police officer Ron Jones, Jr. was shot and killed by Cory Maye while executing a search warrant in 2001.

Geography
U.S. Route 84 passes north and west of the town center on a bypass; the four-lane highway leads east  to Collins and west  to Monticello. Mississippi Highway 13 passes through the town slightly east of the center; it leads north  to Mendenhall and south  to Columbia. Mississippi Highway 42 leads southeast from Prentiss  to Bassfield.

Demographics

2020 census

As of the 2020 United States census, there were 976 people, 429 households, and 289 families residing in the town.

2010 census
As of the 2010 United States Census, there were 1,081 people living in the town. 60.3% were White, 37.3% African American, 0.6% Native American, 0.4% Asian, 0.5% from some other race and 0.9% of two or more races. 0.6% were Hispanic or Latino of any race.

2000 census
As of the census of 2000, there were 1,158 people, 479 households, and 323 families living in the town. The population density was 617.8 people per square mile (239.1/km). There were 537 housing units at an average density of 286.5 per square mile (110.9/km). The racial makeup of the town was 79.53% White, 19.17% African American, 0.60% Native American, 0.09% Asian, and 0.60% from two or more races. Hispanic or Latino of any race were 1.47% of the population.

There were 479 households, out of which 24.4% had children under the age of 18 living with them, 50.9% were married couples living together, 13.4% had a female householder with no husband present, and 32.4% were non-families. 30.9% of all households were made up of individuals, and 18.2% had someone living alone who was 65 years of age or older. The average household size was 2.26 and the average family size was 2.80.

In the town, the population was spread out, with 19.9% under the age of 18, 7.0% from 18 to 24, 23.9% from 25 to 44, 25.7% from 45 to 64, and 23.4% who were 65 years of age or older. The median age was 44 years. For every 100 females, there were 88.3 males. For every 100 females age 18 and over, there were 84.3 males.

The median income for a household in the town was $29,200, and the median income for a family was $38,571. Males had a median income of $31,875 versus $21,806 for females. The per capita income for the town was $18,486. About 17.2% of families and 22.5% of the population were below the poverty line, including 47.6% of those under age 18 and 9.7% of those age 65 or over.

Arts and culture

Annual events
Prentiss hosts an annual "Run for the Roses 5K Run/Walk".

Tourism
Local attractions include:
 The Holloway-Polk house – the oldest continuously inhabited settlement in Jefferson Davis County.
 Lake Jeff Davis – a campground and picnic area southeast of Prentiss.
 Mt. Zion Church and Cemetery – the second-oldest African American church and cemetery in Jefferson Davis County.
 Spring Hill Missionary Baptist Church and Cemetery (c. 1847) – the oldest African American Baptist Church and cemetery in Jefferson Davis County.

Parks and recreation
In 1993, the Canadian National Railway announced it would abandon the former Illinois Central line which ran through Prentiss.  This enabled the construction of the Longleaf Trace, Mississippi's first recreational rail trail, located between Prentiss and Hattiesburg.

Government
Detachment 2 of the 155th Brigade Combat Team of the Mississippi Army National Guard is located in Prentiss.

Education
Prentiss is served by the Jefferson Davis County School District.

A football rivalry exists between Prentiss High School's "Bulldogs" and Columbia High School's "Wildcats".  In one notable game during the 1970s the Bulldogs were winning 6-0 when Wildcats' player Walter Payton scored two touchdowns, running 95 yards for the first touchdown and 65 yards for the second.  The Wildcats won 14-6.

There is one private school serving K-12 students, Prentiss Christian School.

Media
The community is served by the Prentiss Headlight newspaper.

Infrastructure

Transportation
Prentiss is accessed from Mississippi Highway 42, Mississippi Highway 13, and U.S. Route 84.

Health care
The Jefferson Davis Community Hospital is located in Prentiss.

Notable people
 Thelma Farr Baxter, member of the Mississippi House of Representatives from 1950 to 1956
 Vincent Davis, judge for the Mississippi 17th Chancery Court District and former Mississippi senator
 Phillip Garrett, former chief of the City of Mobile Police Department
 Toxey Hall, professional boxer and sparring partner of Rocky Marciano; later became a Chicago police officer
 Al Jefferson, Indiana Pacers NBA player
 C. Baxter Kruger, writer and minister of Trinitarian theology
 Charles Magee, the first African American professor at the University of Arkansas' College of Agriculture
 Felecia M. Nave, chemical engineer and 20th President of Alcorn State University
 Clyde Otis, songwriter and record producer
 Garland H. Williams, organized and became the first chief of the U.S. Army's Counterintelligence Corps

In popular culture
Blues musician Houston Stackhouse stated that fellow musician Tommy Johnson: "was stayin' over around Prentiss, Mississippi. I believe, I don't know how long he stayed there, but that was his hangout.  It was out east of Crystal Springs, back there around Prentiss and Pinola, or somewhere back in there.  Big piney thickets and like that."

External links
 Town of Prentiss official website
 Jefferson Davis County Economic Development

References

Towns in Jefferson Davis County, Mississippi
Towns in Mississippi
County seats in Mississippi